Love and Marriage is an American situation comedy that aired on NBC during the 1959-1960 television season. The series stars William Demarest as the owner of a struggling music publishing company.

Synopsis
Bill Harris is a widower who owns the Harris Music Publishing Company in Los Angeles, California. A longtime music publisher and a lover of old-fashioned, melodious music, he hates the rock and roll music that has become popular during the latter half of the 1950s and rejects most of the popular songs submitted to him. As a result, his company is nearly bankrupt, and stress over its financial problems is affecting his health. Bill′s daughter, Pat Baker, wants to keep an eye on him as well as save the family business by convincing Bill that he is wrong about rock and roll and should publish it, so she maneuvers him into taking her on as a partner in the company. She then tries to sign rock and roll musicians with the company and get Bill to publish their music.

Bill shares an apartment with Pat, her husband Steve Baker, who is a lawyer, and their daughters Susan and Jennie. Steve is more progressive than Bill and constantly irritates him, and Susan has to mediate the frequent disputes between them. At the publishing company, Sophie is the secretary and Stubby Wilson is the firm′s song promoter. Stubby performs most of the songs submitted to the firm and is prone to reminiscing about the "good old days" in the music publishing business.

Late in 1959, the Bakers hire a Chinese woman, Han Cho-Yee. as their housekeeper, and a Chinese songwriter, Jimmy Chang, falls in love with her. Jimmy faces the challenge of dealing with Han′s father, Mr. Cho-Yee, a strict man who has set up an arranged marriage to someone else for Han.

Cast
 William Demarest...William "Bill" Harris
 Jeanne Bal...Patricia "Pat" Baker
 Murray Hamilton...Steve Baker
 Kay Armen...Sophie
 Stubby Kaye...Stubby Wilson 
 Susan Reilly...Susan Baker
 Jennie Lynn...Jennie Baker
 Robert Kino...Jimmy Chang
 Judy Dan...Han Cho-Yee
 Benson Fong...Mr. Cho-Yee

Production

Love and Marriage was a production of Louis F. Edelman Enterprises. P. J. Wolfson produced the show. The theme song was an instrumental of "Love and Marriage."

Broadcast history

Love and Marriage  premiered on NBC on September 21, 1959. It lasted only half a season, and only 18 episodes were broadcast, the last of them on January 25, 1960. Another eight episodes never aired. The show was broadcast at 8:00 p.m. Eastern Time on Mondays throughout its run.

Episodes
SOURCE 

NOTE: Episode lists for Love and Marriage place the episode "The Baby Sitter" on January 11, 1960, and the episode "Jealousy" among the show′s unaired episodes. At least one contemporary newspaper listing indicates that "The Baby Sitter" was broadcast on January 11, 1960. However, at least three contemporary newspaper listings indicate that "Jealousy" aired on January 11, 1960.

References

External links
 
 Love and Marriage opening credits on YouTube
 Love and Marriage alternative opening credits on YouTube
 Love and Marriage episode "Second Honeymoon" opening and closing credits on YouTube

1950s American sitcoms
1960s American sitcoms
1959 American television series debuts
1960 American television series endings
Black-and-white American television shows
NBC original programming
Television shows set in Los Angeles
English-language television shows